Humanimal may refer to:
Humanimal (band), a hard rock band
Humanimal (film), a horror movie by Francesc Morales
Humanimal (album), an album by Talisman
Humanimals, an album by Grand Ole Party